John Madden Football is a video game developed by High Score Productions and published by Electronic Arts exclusively for the 3DO.

Gameplay 

John Madden Football features contemporary NFL teams, and historical football teams, as well as an all-Madden team of the best contemporary players, and an all-star team of historical players.

Development and release 

In 1995, Atari Corporation struck a deal with Electronic Arts to bring select titles to the Atari Jaguar CD, with John Madden Football among them but this version was never released due to the commercial and critical failure of the Atari Jaguar platform.

Reception 

Next Generation reviewed the game, rating it four stars out of five, stated that "This is simply the best arcade-style football game currently available."

Entertainment Weekly gave the game a "B" grade and said "This game's on-screen players are huge, the generous video clips are broadcast-TV quality, and there are enough obscure play options to satisfy Monday- and Tuesday- morning quarterbacks. But anyone willing to learn the difference between a quick slant I formation and a single-back halfback sweep is going to want more incisive commentary from Madden than, 'Now that was great defense!'"

In 1996, GamesMaster ranked the game 10th on their "The GamesMasters 3DO Top 10."

Reviews 
 GamePro (Jun, 1994)
 Electronic Gaming Monthly (May, 1994)
 ASM (Aktueller Software Markt) - Jul, 1994

References

External links 
 John Madden Football at GameFAQs
 John Madden Football at Giant Bomb
 John Madden Football at MobyGames

1994 video games
3DO Interactive Multiplayer games
3DO Interactive Multiplayer-only games
Cancelled Atari Jaguar games
High Score Productions games
Madden NFL
Multiplayer and single-player video games
Video games developed in Canada